Brent Renouf (born 3 May 1988 in New Zealand) is a former Australian rules football player who played with the Hawthorn Football Club and Port Adelaide Football Club in the Australian Football League.

Early life
Renouf was born in New Zealand and moved to Australia's Gold Coast at an early age where he attended Benowa State High School. He began playing Australian rules football for the Surfers Paradise Demons.

AFL career
Renouf was drafted with selection 24 in the 2006 AFL Draft from the Southport Sharks and made his AFL début in round 12 of 2008. In his third game of senior football he was reported for striking Adam Selwood from the West Coast Eagles and suspended for two matches.

His eighth AFL match was the 2008 AFL Grand Final and as part of the winning team, he received a premiership medallion.

In December 2008, Renouf was arrested following a drunken incident on Burwood Road, Hawthorn, in which he climbed over two parked cars, breaking the windscreen of one. Police indicated he would be charged with criminal damage, the Hawthorn Football Club fined him $5,000 and suspended him for two matches.

Renouf required a skin graft after falling into a fire at Surfers Paradise in December 2009.

Due to injuries to Max Bailey, Simon Taylor and Wayde Skipper, Renouf took the job as number one ruckman for the 2010 season.

In 2011 he had his gall bladder removed after suffering an injury playing against Geelong in round 5.

He was traded to Port Adelaide for pick 33 in the 2011 AFL Draft. At the end of 2013 he was delisted by Port, but was re-drafted in the rookie draft. He was delisted by the Power at the end of the 2014 season.

Since his retirement, Renouf has spent time as a line coach for the Northern Territory Thunder.

Statistics

|- style=background:#EAEAEA
| 2007 ||  || 34
| 0 || — || — || — || — || — || — || — || — || — || — || — || — || — || — || — || — || 0
|-
| bgcolor=F0E68C | 2008# ||  || 34
| 8 || 0 || 0 || 21 || 44 || 65 || 20 || 28 || 82 || 0.0 || 0.0 || 2.6 || 5.5 || 8.1 || 2.5 || 3.5 || 10.3 || 0
|- style=background:#EAEAEA
| 2009 ||  || 34
| 15 || 1 || 4 || 29 || 101 || 130 || 30 || 47 || 210 || 0.1 || 0.3 || 1.9 || 6.7 || 8.7 || 2.0 || 3.1 || 14.0 || 0
|-
| 2010 ||  || 34
| 22 || 4 || 8 || 78 || 136 || 214 || 74 || 71 || 426 || 0.2 || 0.4 || 3.5 || 6.2 || 9.7 || 3.4 || 3.2 || 19.4 || 2
|- style=background:#EAEAEA
| 2011 ||  || 34
| 7 || 4 || 1 || 25 || 28 || 53 || 17 || 22 || 120 || 0.6 || 0.1 || 3.6 || 4.0 || 7.6 || 2.4 || 3.1 || 17.1 || 0
|-
| 2012 ||  || 4
| 10 || 2 || 2 || 34 || 49 || 83 || 27 || 20 || 253 || 0.2 || 0.2 || 3.4 || 4.9 || 8.3 || 2.7 || 2.0 || 25.3 || 0
|- style=background:#EAEAEA
| 2013 ||  || 4
| 5 || 2 || 0 || 12 || 21 || 33 || 8 || 8 || 79 || 0.4 || 0.0 || 2.4 || 4.2 || 6.6 || 1.6 || 1.6 || 15.8 || 0
|-
| 2014 ||  || 4
| 1 || 0 || 1 || 1 || 2 || 3 || 1 || 1 || 13 || 0.0 || 1.0 || 1.0 || 2.0 || 3.0 || 1.0 || 1.0 || 13.0 || 0
|- class="sortbottom"
! colspan=3| Career
! 68 !! 13 !! 16 !! 200 !! 381 !! 581 !! 177 !! 197 !! 1183 !! 0.2 !! 0.2 !! 2.9 !! 5.6 !! 8.5 !! 2.6 !! 2.9 !! 17.4 !! 2
|}

Honours and achievmenets
Team
 AFL premiership player: 2008

References

External links

1988 births
Living people
VFL/AFL players born outside Australia
Southport Australian Football Club players
Hawthorn Football Club players
Hawthorn Football Club Premiership players
Port Adelaide Football Club players
Port Adelaide Football Club players (all competitions)
Norwood Football Club players
New Zealand players of Australian rules football
Australian rules footballers from Queensland
New Zealand emigrants to Australia
One-time VFL/AFL Premiership players